The New Orleans-class cruisers were a class of seven heavy cruisers built for the United States Navy (USN) in the 1930s.

These ships participated in the heaviest surface battles of the Pacific War. Astoria, Quincy, and Vincennes were all sunk in the Battle of Savo Island, and three others were heavily damaged in subsequent battles in the Guadalcanal campaign.
Only Tuscaloosa, which spent most of the war in the Atlantic, got through the war without being damaged. Collectively, ships of the class earned 64 battle stars. The four surviving ships were laid up immediately after the end of the war, and sold for scrap in 1959.

Design
The New Orleans-class design was a test bed for innovations in cruiser design, and there were three distinct designs within the class.
 Design #1: New Orleans, Astoria, and Minneapolis.
 Design #2: Tuscaloosa and San Francisco.
 Design #3: Quincy and Vincennes.

This class was the direct ancestor for all subsequent USN gun cruisers. While the Washington Naval Treaty was still being observed, new technology was implemented in the New Orleans class because the USN knew that if and when war came, they would need this knowledge to build ships (which were already in the planning stage) beyond the treaty limits. The USN came to the conclusion that no 10,000-ton cruiser could adequately perform the roles given.

Three ships of the class (Astoria, Quincy, and Vincennes) were lost in the Battle of Savo Island in 1942. Immediately following the Guadalcanal campaign the remaining ships of the class went through major overhauls to lessen top-heaviness caused by new electrical and radar systems and anti-aircraft weaponry which had been added as technology advanced. In doing so, the ships took on a new appearance, most notably in the bridge area, and became known as the  New Orleans class. The four survivors were decommissioned shortly after the war ended, and scrapped in 1959–1961.

Armor

The New Orleans class was the last series of US cruisers completed to the limitations of the Washington Naval Treaty of 1922. As completed, the single ship  Wichita class (and subsequent heavy cruisers) exceeded the 10,000-ton standard.

All of the cruisers of the New Orleans class were outwardly similar but the displacement among these ships varied by some 600 tons. The Bureau of Construction and Repair authorized a contemporary  gun cruiser design of smaller size, but one which allocated considerably more tonnage towards protection. The New Orleans class was noteworthy for its protection. For the first time in US cruisers, barbette and turret armor was sufficient to withstand 8-inch shellfire.

Magazine protection was further increased by placing them well below the waterline. Otherwise only an internal splinter belt and the armor deck protected the magazines. While this allowed an exceptional degree of armored protection for the vitals against shellfire, there was little protected hull volume, and the deep magazines were more exposed to underwater damage ( learned this the hard way at the Battle of Tassafaronga). Protection represented approximately 15% of normal displacement as opposed to the only 5.6% in the Pensacolas and 6% in the Northampton and Portland classes. Unfortunately, fuel bunkerage had to be reduced, which resulted in a smaller operational range.

Armament 
The main armament on the class centered on nine 8 in/55 caliber Mark 14 guns (Mark 9 guns until replaced in World War II), mounted in triple turrets. New Orleans was fitted with Mark 14 Mod 0 guns, Minneapolis with the Mark 15 Mod 1 guns and the remaining ships of the class received Mark 12 Mod 0 guns. The turret face configurations were also different with the Mark 14 guns being housed in rounded face turrets and the Mark 12 and 15 guns in a flat faced turret.

Secondary armament for the class consisted of eight 5 in/25 caliber dual purpose guns, which could be used against surface and aerial targets, as well as .50 caliber water-cooled machine guns to augment the 5 in guns. When the US entered the war in December 1941, the New Orleans class and other "Treaty" cruisers were rushed into battle with little modification and lacking in air defense. The Japanese proved at Pearl Harbor and with the sinking of Prince of Wales and Repulse off Malaya that this war would be decided with air power. As soon as available, the quadruple 1.1 in guns and the Swiss-designed 20 mm Oerlikon cannon (which would replace the .50 caliber guns) were fitted, as well as early radar units and fire control directors. As the war progressed, developments in radar abilities gave the Allies an increasingly decisive advantage over the enemy. In late 1942, the arrival of the 40 mm Bofors (in twin and quadruple mountings), replaced the quadruple 1.1-inch autocannons, which had proved ineffective. 

By late 1945, even after the removal of many non-essential items (half of their spotter planes as well as a crane and a catapult became non-essential due to advances in radar) the ships became dangerously over weight because of new weaponry and electrical and radar equipment. The threat from the air was so intense this condition had to be tolerated.

Appearance and performance 
Outwardly, the New Orleans ships had a distinctive appearance and were considered very good-looking vessels, though the 1942–43 refits of the surviving ships changed the appearance substantially.  The forward superstructure had the bridge wings cut back, and all of the large size windows were plated in with just a few port holes taking their place.  The open bridge above the wheel house was enlarged by 100 percent by extending it forward.  In addition several gun tubs were created for the 40 mm Bofors mounts both around the main mast, and aft. The forecastle deck extended back to the second funnel and the main superstructure was constructed without the ungainly tripod mast seen on the previous cruisers. The bow was a raked type, similar to those of British cruisers. The two funnels were situated closer together with a large search light tower in between. Aircraft handling facilities were moved further aft and a larger second conning station erected above the hangar. A single mainmast was erected there, between two huge pedestal cranes which handled both spotter planes and small craft. The main 8-inch turrets, although armored, were actually smaller with a more effective angular faceplate. By enlarging the forecastle deck, the secondary battery of 5-inch guns were mounted closer together, facilitating a more efficient ammunition delivery. 

Power was provided by eight Babcock & Wilcox  steam boilers that produced  for the four Westinghouse gearing steam turbines. Their range could be extended by refueling from an oiler or another ship fitted to transfer oil while underway. 

The New Orleans cruisers performed peacetime exercises well with no serious shortcomings being found. While many changes were implemented to improve their performance and especially their protection, the 10,000-ton limit of the Washington Naval Treaty was not exceeded. The new cruisers were considered successful in their own right but could not be considered equal to some foreign contemporaries, which were often considerably larger.

Ships in class

World War II 
For almost four years, the ships of the New Orleans class were assigned to the most urgent of front line duties, becoming involved in much deadly action. Astoria, Quincy and Vincennes were sunk in the Battle of Savo Island, 8–9 Aug 1942.  Although three of their number were lost, the ships proved to be well designed. New Orleans, Minneapolis and San Francisco were also seriously damaged in early war engagements in the Pacific. These engagements included the Naval Battle of Guadalcanal, in which San Francisco engaged enemy ships at point blank range, and the Battle of Tassafaronga where Minneapolis and New Orleans took heavy damage and losses from Long Lance torpedoes. Damage control work and skillful seamanship kept these ships afloat to continue to fight through the end of the war.

New Orleans-class cruisers were found at every major naval skirmish of World War II in the Pacific despite the fact there were only four of the seven units remaining after the first year of war. They were some of the most used and hardest fought ships of the US Navy during the war. Three ships of this class were among the most decorated US ships of World War II. San Francisco earned 17 Battle Stars and a Presidential Unit Citation, New Orleans earned 17 Battle Stars, and Minneapolis earned 17 Battle Stars as well. As a class, they earned a total of 64 Battle Stars and a Presidential Unit Citation.

See also 
 
 List of cruisers of the United States Navy

References

External links 

 Global Security.org – New Orleans class cruiser
 Global Security.org – New Orleans class cruiser specifications

Cruiser classes